Stephen Biesty (born 27 January 1961) is a British illustrator. Biesty is considered a master of cross section. He frequently collaborates with Richard Platt, who writes the text for the majority of his books, which have covered a wide range of informative cross sections aimed at adults and children, all published by Dorling Kindersley.

Early life and education
Stephen Biesty was born in Coventry and grew up in Leicestershire.

In 1979 he joined Loughborough College of Art and Design where he did an arts foundation course. In 1980 he moved to Brighton Polytechnic to gain a BA Hons in Graphic Design specialising in illustration, focusing on historical and architectural drawings. After graduating from Brighton with a first class degree, Biesty went on to gain an MA in Graphic Design at the City of Birmingham Polytechnic, working further in historical reconstruction.

Career
Biesty's work has found great success, notably his Incredible Cross Sections (1992) is an international bestseller with over one million copies in print worldwide. Other Biesty books written by Platt include Man-of-War (1993), Castle (1994), Incredible Pop-Up Cross-Sections (1995), Incredible Explosions (1996), Incredible Everything (1997), Incredible Body (1998) and Absolutely Best Cross-Sections Book Ever (1999). Since 1999 he has also illustrated the Millennium Dome Pop-up Book (1999), Gold: A Treasure Hunt through Time (Meredith Hooper) (2002), and Rome (Andrew Solway, Stephen Biesty) (2003).  Castle was later made into the educational video game Castle Explorer, as was Man-of-War which was made into Stowaway! A tour of an 18th century Man-of-War. Some have compared Biesty's Incredible Cross Sections to fellow British illustrator Martin Handford's Where's Wally? series; for instance in Man-of-War there is the challenge of spotting the stowaway. 
 
Biesty uses paper, pen, ink and water colour paints. He never uses a ruler, drawing everything freehand.

Biesty describes his work as follows:

There's really no end to the amount of detail you can include. I don't use a computer and I don't think I ever will. I draw with a pencil initially and then I work on top of that with ink, usually a Rotring needle-point pen, but sometimes I use a fine brush which gives the line a little variety, a little texture. Then of course I add colour and atmosphere with watercolour washes.

I always put figures in. As an illustrator you quickly catch on to the fact that nobody's going to look at it if there's no human interest. When you start including figures, you can begin to create a sense of atmosphere. You can show how people relate to a space and you can explore the realities and practicalities of the place, how people lived, how they adapted to their surroundings, how they slept, how they ate.

Personal life
Biesty now lives in Somerset with his wife and son.

Bibliography
1991: Explore the World of Man-made Wonders (Simon Adams)

1992: Exploring the Past: Ancient Egypt (George Hart)

1992: Incredible Cross-Sections (Richard Platt)

1993: Man-of-War (Richard Platt)

1994: Castle (Richard Platt)

1996: Incredible Explosions (Richard Platt)

1998: Incredible Body (Richard Platt)

1999: Absolutely Best Cross-Sections Book Ever (Richard Platt)

1999: Millennium Dome Pop-up Book

2001: The Coolest Cross-Sections Ever! (Richard Platt)

2002: Gold: A Treasure Hunt through Time (Meredith Hooper)

2003: Rome (Andrew Solway)

2005: Egypt (Stewart Ross)

2006: Greece (Stewart Ross)

2008: Ancient World: Egypt, Rome, and Greece

2014: The Story of Buildings, Walker Books. 

2014: Castles (Meredith Hooper)

2014: Giant Vehicles (Rod Green)

2014: Into the Unknown: How Great Explorers Found Their Way by Land, Sea, and Air (Stewart Ross)

2015: To the Rescue (Rod Green)

2015: Emergency Vehicles (Rod Green)

2017: Trains (Ian Graham)

2017: Exploring Space: From Galileo to the Mars Rover and Beyond (Martin Jenkins)

2018: Flying Machines (Ian Graham)

References

External links
 
 

 

1961 births
Alumni of Birmingham Institute of Art and Design
British children's book illustrators
Living people